1977 in philosophy

Events

Publications
 Burge, Tyler. "Belief de re." Journal of Philosophy 74, 338–62.
 Dennett, Daniel. "A Cure for the Common Code." Reprinted in D. Dennett (1978) Brainstorms: Philosophical Essays on Mind and Psychology. MIT Press.
 Dworkin, Ronald. Taking Rights Seriously. Harvard University Press
 Evans, Gareth. "Pronouns, Quantifiers and Relative Clauses (I)." Canadian Journal of Philosophy VIII, 3, 467–536.
 Hornsby, Jennifer. "Singular Terms in Contexts of Propositional Attitude," Mind 86: 31–48.
 Johnson-Laird, Philip N. and Wason, P. C. Thinking: Readings in Cognitive Science. Cambridge University Press.
 Kosslyn, Stephen and Pomerantz, J. R. "Imagery, Propositions, and the Form of Internal Representations," Cognitive Psychology 9: 52–76.
 Kripke, Saul. "Speaker's Reference and Semantic Reference." Midwest Studies in Philosophy 2: 255–76. (In: French, Uehling and Wettstein (eds.), Contemporary Perspectives in the Philosophy of Language. University of Minnesota Press, 6–27.)
 Lakoff, Robin. "What you can do with words: Politeness, pragmatics and performatives." In: Proceedings of the Texas Conference on Performatives, Presuppositions and Implicatures, ed. R. Rogers, R. Wall & J. Murphy, pp. 79–106. Center for Applied Linguistics
 McDowell, John. "On the Sense and Reference of Proper Names." Mind 86, 159–185.
 McGinn, Colin. "Charity, Interpretation, and Belief." Journal of Philosophy 74: 521–535.
 McGinn, Colin. "Semantics for Nonindicative Sentences." Philosophical Studies 32: 301–311.

Births

Deaths
 February 12 – Herman Dooyeweerd (born 1894)
 August 4 – Ernst Bloch (born 1885)
 September 4 – E. F. Schumacher (born 1911)

References

Philosophy
20th-century philosophy
Philosophy by year